DeLeon or De Leon is a surname. Notable people with the surname include:

Alexander DeLeon (born 1989), US musician
Count de Leon (1788–1834), German alchemist and mystic, born Bernhard Müller
Carlos De León (1959–2020), Puerto Rico-born US athlete in boxing
Daniel De Leon (1856–1914), US political activist and newspaper editor
Edwin de Leon (1818–1891), US lawyer and newspaper editor
Gloria DeLeon (born 1952), US social worker
Idalis DeLeón (born 1966), US singer and television personality
Jack DeLeon (1924–2006), US television actor
José DeLeón (born 1960), Dominican Republic-born US athlete in baseball
Kevin de León (born 1966), US politician
Leroy DeLeon (born 1948), Trinidad & Tobago-born US athlete in football
Luis DeLeón (born 1958), Puerto Rico-born US athlete in baseball
Millie DeLeon (1873–1922), US stage performer
Nick DeLeon (born 1990), US football player
Oscar D'León (born 1943), Venezuelan musician
Rafael de Leon (1908–1999), Trinidad & Tobago musician, known as Roaring Lion
Ronnie Deleon (f. 1980s-1990s), US kickboxer
Russ DeLeon (born 1965), US attorney and co-founder of PartyGaming
Skylar Deleon (born 1979), US actor convicted of a 2004 murder
Walter DeLeon (1884–1947), US screenwriter